Folklore of Spain encompasses the folklore, folktales, oral traditions, and (urban) legends of Spain.

Folktales 

 The Bird of Truth
 The Knights of the Fish
 The Sprig of Rosemary
 The Vain Little Mouse
 The Water of Life
 The Wounded Lion

Legends 
 Legend of la Encantada

References